Amazones d'Hier, Lesbiennes d'Aujourd'hui (AHLA; Amazons of Yesterday, Lesbians of Today) is the name of a quarterly French language magazine published starting 1982 by a lesbian collective in Montreal made of Louise Turcotte, Danielle Charest, Genette Bergeron and Ariane Brunet.

AHLA was written from a radical lesbian (Lesbiennes radicales) perspective, and aimed to offer analysis and reflection about political and philosophical issues affecting lesbians globally as well as in Quebec.

The magazine's content drew heavily from Francophone material feminism, and the ideas of French theorists Monique Wittig and Nicole-Claude Mathieu. The front page of every issue clearly stated that the magazine was intended "for lesbians only".

1982 documentary

An eponymously titled documentary was developed from 1979 to 1981 and produced by video production collective Réseau Vidé-Elle, in English and French versions. The film premiered on June 13, 1982, in Montreal.

See also
List of lesbian periodicals
List of LGBT films directed by women
List of LGBT-related films

References

External links
Equivox - Review Amazons of Yesterday, Lesbians of Today (1996), YouTube

1982 films
1982 documentary films
1982 establishments in Quebec
Canadian LGBT-related films
LGBT-related magazines published in Canada
Quarterly magazines published in Canada
Women's magazines published in Canada
Documentary films about lesbians
Feminist magazines
Films shot in Montreal
French-language magazines published in Canada
Lesbian culture in Canada
Lesbian feminist literature
Lesbian-related films
Lesbian-related magazines
LGBT culture in Montreal
Magazines established in 1982
Magazines published in Montreal
Radical feminist literature
Women in Quebec
1980s LGBT literature
Marxist feminism
1982 LGBT-related films
French-language Canadian films
1980s Canadian films
1980s French-language films